Bittou or Bitou is a department or commune of Boulgou Province in eastern Burkina Faso. Its capital is the town of Bittou. According to the 2019 census the department has a total population of 102,400.

Towns and villages

 Bittou (or Bitou) (31 210 inhabitants) (capital)
 Bekoure (2 676 inhabitants) 
 Belayerla (1 230 inhabitants) 
 Bourzoaga (17 inhabitants) 
 Dema (1 535 inhabitants) 
 Fottigue (2 698 inhabitants) 
 Garanga (1 561 inhabitants) 
 Gnangdin (4 495 inhabitants) 
 Kankamogre (3 028 inhabitants) 
 Kankamogre-Peulh (960 inhabitants) 
 Kanyire (1 940 inhabitants) 
 Kodemzoaga (594 inhabitants) 
 Komtenga (157 inhabitants) 
 Largue (621 inhabitants) 
 Loaba (3 518 inhabitants) 
 Loaba-Peulh (1 768 inhabitants) 
 Mogandé (350 inhabitants) 
 Mogandé-Peulh (350 inhabitants) 
 Mogomnore (2 422 inhabitants) 
 Nianle (1 574 inhabitants) 
 Nohao (1 555 inhabitants) 
 Sangabouli (1 164 inhabitants) 
 Sawenga (5 039 inhabitants) 
 Tiba (1 692 inhabitants) 
 Zambanega (1 046 inhabitants) 
 Zampa (1 974 inhabitants) 
 Zekeze (2 571 inhabitants)

References

Departments of Burkina Faso
Boulgou Province